Jaan Sitska (16 February 1867 Tali Parish, Pärnu County - 31 May 1937 Tallinn) was an Estonian politician. He was a member of the Estonian Constituent Assembly from 23 January 1920. He replaced Juhan Ostrat.

References

1867 births
1937 deaths
Members of the Estonian Constituent Assembly